Léo Pons  (born 4 October 1996) is a French filmmaker. He is best known as the director of Le Hobbit : Le Retour du roi du Cantal (2015) and is famous for making movies promoting his region Cantal. He directed several TV spots and short films.

Filmography

Film
 2014: Le Hobbit : Les Origines du Cantal
 2014: Cantal, what else ?
 2015: Le Hobbit : Le retour du roi du Cantal
 2016: Smiling in Aurillac
 2016: "CHUT!"

References
 Léo Pons on Allocine.fr
 Léo Pons on Yahoo News
 A 17 ans, Léo Pons projette ce soir le 2e opus de sa parodie, inspirée du Seigneur des anneaux
  "Cantal, what else ?", un Auvergnat parodie Clooney et Dujardin
 Les coups d'éclat du réalisateur Léo Pons
 Interview de Léo Pons, réalisateur du Hobbit du Cantal

External links

 
 

1996 births
Living people
Fantasy film directors
French film directors